The Salinas monjita (Neoxolmis salinarum) is a species of bird in the tyrant flycatchers family Tyrannidae which is endemic to Argentina. It is threatened by habitat loss.

Taxonomy
This species was formerly placed in the genus Xolmis. Following the publication of a molecular phylogenetic study in 2020, it was one of three species moved to Neoxolmis.

References

Neoxolmis
Birds of Argentina
Endemic birds of Argentina
Birds described in 1979
Taxonomy articles created by Polbot
Taxobox binomials not recognized by IUCN